Greg Failla (born March 9, 1968) is an American former professional tennis player.

A native of Kirkland, Washington, Failla moved to San Diego when he was a teenager and as a student at Ramona High School was the 1985 CIF boys' singles champion. He was a two-time All-American for Cal State-Long Beach (1987 & 1988) and during this time broke into the top 10 of the national collegiate rankings. In 1989 he transferred to The University of Southern California for his senior year.

Failla had a best singles world ranking of 249 on the professional tour and appeared in the qualifying draw for all four grand slam tournaments. His best performance on the Grand Prix/ATP circuits came at Indianapolis in 1988, where he beat Marty Davis to make second round.

Personal life
Failla married tennis player Katrina Crawford and they have four children. Their eldest daughter, Jessica, currently competes on the professional tour.

ATP Challenger finals

Doubles: 1 (0–1)

References

External links
 
 

1968 births
Living people
American male tennis players
Tennis people from Washington (state)
Long Beach State Beach men's tennis players
USC Trojans men's tennis players
Sportspeople from Kirkland, Washington